The 2010 Iowa gubernatorial election was held on Tuesday, November 2, 2010 to elect the governor and lieutenant governor, to serve a four-year term beginning on January 14, 2011. In Iowa, the governor and lieutenant governor are elected on the same ballot.

The two major party candidates were first-term incumbent governor Chet Culver, a Democrat, who ran for re-election with first-term incumbent lieutenant governor Patty Judge, and former four-term governor Terry Branstad, who won a three-way primary for the Republican nomination and ran with State Senator Kim Reynolds.

Branstad defeated Culver in the general election, becoming the first challenger to unseat an incumbent Iowa governor since Harold Hughes in 1962.

Democratic primary

Candidates
Chet Culver, incumbent Governor

Results

Republican primary

Candidates

On ballot
As listed by the Iowa Secretary of State's office:
 
Terry Branstad, former Governor
Rod Roberts, State Representative
Bob Vander Plaats, businessman and nominee for lieutenant governor in 2006

Withdrew
State Senator Paul McKinley withdrew after Terry Branstad formed an exploratory committee
Cedar Rapids businessman Christian Fong suspended his campaign due to a lack of campaign finances
Minority Leader of the Iowa House of Representatives Christopher Rants withdrew from the race due to lack of campaign funds
State Senator Jerry Behn withdrew from the race and endorsed Terry Branstad

Polling

Results

General election

Candidates
Chet Culver (D), incumbent governor; running with incumbent lieutenant governor Patty Judge.
Gregory James Hughes (I), running with Robin Prior-Calef.
Terry Branstad (R), former four-term governor; running with State Senator Kim Reynolds.
 Eric Cooper (L), professor at Iowa State University; running with judicial administrator Nick Weltha.
Jonathan Narcisse (Iowa Party), former member of the Des Moines school board; running with truck driver Rick Marlar. Narcisse is a Democrat and Marlar is a Republican.  Narcisse's campaign and that of Senate District 45 candidate Douglas William Phillips were not affiliated, though both appeared on the ballot under the "Iowa Party" name.
David Rosenfeld (SWP), running with Helen Meyers.

Predictions

Polling

Results

References

External links
Iowa Secretary of State – Voter/Elections
Iowa Governor Candidates at Project Vote Smart
Campaign contributions for 2010 Iowa Governor from Follow the Money
2010 Iowa Gubernatorial General Election: All Head-to-Head Matchups graph of multiple polls from Pollster.com
Election 2010: Iowa Governor from Rasmussen Reports
2010 Iowa Governor – Branstad vs. Culver from Real Clear Politics
2010 Iowa Governor's Race from CQ Politics
Race Profile in The New York Times
Debates
Iowa Gubernatorial Debate, C-SPAN, September 14, 2010
Official campaign websites (Archived)
Chet Culver for Governor 
Greg Hughes – Independent for Governor
Eric Cooper for Governor
Terry Branstad for Governor
Jonathan Narcisse for Governor
Bob Vander Plaats for Governor

Gubernatorial
Iowa
2010